John McCann (17 June 1905 – 23 February 1980) was an Irish politician, author and journalist.

McCann was born 17 June 1905 at 28 Raymond Street, Dublin, son of Francis McCann, a painter, and Margaret McCann (née Mernagh). He was educated at Synge Street CBS, and Kevin St. and Bolton St. Colleges, he helped organise a Fianna Éireann company in the latter institutions. 

A founder member of Fianna Fáil in 1926, he became increasingly involved in politics and was elected to the party's national executive. McCann stood unsuccessfully for election at the 1937 and 1938 general elections. He was first elected to Dáil Éireann as a Fianna Fáil Teachta Dála (TD) at the Dublin South by-election held on 6 June 1939.

The by-election was caused by the death of James Beckett of Fine Gael. McCann was re-elected at each general election until he lost his seat at the 1954 general election. He served as Lord Mayor of Dublin from 1947 to 1948 and 1964 to 1965.

He was the father of actor Donal McCann.

Three of McCann's plays were published: Twenty years a-wooing (1954); Early and often (c.1956); I know where I'm going (c.1965).

References

 

1905 births
1980 deaths
Fianna Fáil TDs
Lord Mayors of Dublin
Members of the 10th Dáil
Members of the 11th Dáil
Members of the 12th Dáil
Members of the 13th Dáil
Members of the 14th Dáil
People from Templeogue
Politicians from County Dublin